The Croissant Park Administration Building is a historic site in Fort Lauderdale, Florida. It is located at 1421 South Andrews Avenue. On July 25, 2001, it was added to the U.S. National Register of Historic Places.

Building

Built in the mission revival architectural style in 1923 the architect is believed to be Francis Abreu. Abreu designed many Fort Lauderdale buildings during the 1920s. An L-shaped two-story poured concrete building it features a textured stucco exterior and concrete lamps on the roof corners. The 6,000 square foot building has a cut corner entrance and a flat roof with parapets. Inside a cypress wood staircase leads to the second floor which has Dade Pine floors.

Croissant Park

G. Frank Croissant used this building as headquarters for sales of the Croissant Park development. Croissant Park was built from 1,200 acres Croissant bought in 1924 for $1.25 million. It was one of the largest Fort Lauderdale developments of the Florida land boom of the 1920s.

Modern times
In 2001 the owners of the building and the Sam Gilliam house received an award for the rehabilitation and preservation of the two buildings from the Fort Lauderdale Historical Society.

Notes

References

Further reading
 Article on G. Frank Croissant.

External links

National Register of Historic Places in Broward County, Florida
Buildings and structures in Fort Lauderdale, Florida